The Poème de l'amour et de la mer (literally, Poem of Love and the Sea), Op. 19, is a song cycle for voice and orchestra by Ernest Chausson.  It was composed over an extended period between 1882 and 1892 and dedicated to Henri Duparc.  Chausson would write another major work in the same genre, the Chanson perpétuelle, in 1898.

The Poème consists of two parts separated by an orchestral interlude, based on the poems La Fleur des eaux (The Flower of the Waters) and La Mort de l'amour (The Death of Love) by Chausson's friend Maurice Bouchor (1855–1929).  Bouchor also provided the lyrics for another fifteen mélodies by Chausson.  One such song was Le Temps des lilas (The Time of Lilacs), the last four verses of which Chausson transcribed and incorporated into the ending of the second part of the Poème.

At the premiere on February 21, 1893, in Brussels, Chausson himself played the piano to accompany the tenor Désiré Demest.  The orchestral version was first performed on April 8 the same year by the soprano Éléonore Blanc and the Orchestre de la Société Nationale de Musique, conducted by Gabriel Marie.  The piece typically takes just under 30 minutes to perform.

External links
Program notes from the American Symphony Orchestra
French text and English translation of La fleur des eaux
French text and English translation of La mort de l'amour
Scores at IMSLP

Song cycles by Ernest Chausson
Classical song cycles in French
French-language songs
1892 compositions
Music based on poems